Gangapurna is a mountain in Gandaki Province, Nepal. It was first ascended in 1965 by a German expedition via its south face and east ridge. Gangapurna is entirely located in the Annapurna Conservation Area.

Geography 
It is part of the Annapurna mountain range in north-central Nepal, and Gangapurna is on the main ridge that connects Annapurna I to Gangapurna and Annapurna III.

The mountain is named after Ganga, the Hindu goddess who is a personification of the river Ganges. Gangapurna entirely lies in the Annapurna Conservation Area, Nepal's largest protected area established in 1985, which also encompasses Annapurna Sanctuary and is known for several trekking routes including Annapurna Circuit. The glaciers of Gangapurna, Annapurna IV, Khangsar Kang, and Glacier Dom create Gangapurna Lake, and the glaciers of the mountain have been melting extensively due to climate change.

Climbing history 
On 6 May 1965, Gangapurna was first climbed by Erich Reismueller, Ang Temba Sherpa, and Phu Dorjee Sherpa during a German expedition via its south face and east ridge. A Japanese expedition managed a second ascent in 1971 before after avalanches killed eight members over a two-day period, the single worst climbing disaster in the Annapurna Himal to date. Another Japanese party succeeded without major incident in 1974. 

In 1981, Canadian James Blench and John Lauchlan climbed the mountain using the Alpine style which is considered to be a "remarkable achievement for the era". 
In 1988, Gudmundur Petursson led an Icelandic expedition via its east ridge, due to a three-day thunderstorm that added 50 cm of snow to the mountain every day and it posed a threat of an avalanche, they abandoned the expedition after reaching . The same year, there were two unsuccessful expeditions led by Spanish mountaineer Francisco Jose Palacios. In 2017, three Korean climbers climbed Gangapurna using a newly discovered south face route, and won a "Special Mention" at the 2017 Piolet d'Or.

Neighbouring peaks 

 Singu Chuli:  
 Annapurna III:  
 Annapurna IV:

References

External links 

 Gangapurna at Nepal Himal Peak Profile

Seven-thousanders of the Himalayas
Mountains of the Gandaki Province